Escuela para solteras ("School for Singles") is a 1965 Mexican film. It stars Luis Aguilar, Antonio Aguilar, Amador Bendayán, Javier Solís, Sara García, Fanny Cano, Óscar Ortiz de Pinedo, Flor Silvestre, Lucha Moreno, Alma Delia Fuentes, Carmela Rey, José Alfredo Jiménez, and Manuel López Ochoa

Plot 
Amador is in love with Estrella as she is with him and they both want to get married, but she is the granddaughter of Doña Bernarda who will not allow the marriage to take place before her other granddaughters marry respectively. Amador will start looking for a husband for each one of them in order to be able to finalize his union with Estrella.

Cast 
 Luis Aguilar as Luis Álvarez
 Antonio Aguilar as Antonio Contreras
 Amador Bendayan as Amador
 Javier Solís as El médico (The doctor)
 Sara García as Doña Bernarda
 Fanny Cano as Estrella
 Óscar Ortiz de Pinedo as Don Filemón (Mr. Filemon)
 Flor Silvestre as Elisa/Felisa
 Lucha Moreno as Lucha
 Alma Delia Fuentes as Julieta 
 Carmela Rey as Lucero
 José Alfredo Jiménez as El desesperado (The desperate)
 Manuel López Ochoa as El ingeniero (The engineer)

External links
 

1965 films
Mexican comedy films
1960s Spanish-language films
1960s Mexican films